The 2020 CONCACAF Women's U-17 Championship qualifying stage will take place between 21–25 August 2019. The teams will compete for four of the 20 berths in the 2020 CONCACAF Women's U-17 Championship final tournament.

Players born on or after 1 January 2003 are eligible to compete.

Teams
The qualifying format has changed since the 2018 edition, and the teams are no longer divided into regional zones.

The 41 CONCACAF teams were ranked based on the CONCACAF Women’s Under-17 Ranking as of 2018. A total of 32 teams entered the tournament. The highest-ranked 16 entrants were exempt from qualifying and advanced directly to the group stage of the final tournament, while the lowest-ranked 16 entrants had to participate in the qualifying stage, where the four group winners advanced to the round of 16 of the knockout stage of the final tournament.

Notes

Draw
The draw for the group stage took place on 9 May 2019, 11:00 EDT (UTC−4), at the CONCACAF Headquarters in Miami. The 16 teams which entered the qualifying stage were drawn into four groups of four teams. Based on the CONCACAF Women's Under-17 Ranking, the 16 teams were distributed into four pots, as follows:

Qualifying stage
The winners of each group qualify for the final tournament, where they enter the round of 16 of the knockout stage.

Tiebreakers
The ranking of teams in each group is determined as follows (Regulations Article 12.4):
Points obtained in all group matches (three points for a win, one for a draw, zero for a loss);
Goal difference in all group matches;
Number of goals scored in all group matches;
Points obtained in the matches played between the teams in question;
Goal difference in the matches played between the teams in question;
Number of goals scored in the matches played between the teams in question;
Fair play points in all group matches (only one deduction could be applied to a player in a single match):
Yellow card: −1 points;
Indirect red card (second yellow card): −3 points;
Direct red card: −4 points;
Yellow card and direct red card: −5 points;
Drawing of lots.

Group A
Matches are played at the Estadio Olímpico Metropolitano, San Pedro Sula in Honduras. All times are local, CST (UTC−6).

Group B
Matches are played at the Truman Bodden Sports Complex, George Town in Cayman Islands. All times are local, EST (UTC−5).

Group C
Matches are played at the Wildey Turf, Wildey in Barbados. All times are local, AST (UTC−4).

Group D
Matches are played at the Ergilio Hato Stadium, Willemstad in Curaçao. All times are local, AST (UTC−4).

References

External links
Concacaf Women's Under-17 Championship, CONCACAF.com

Qualifying stage
Women's U-17 Championship qualifying stage
2019 in women's association football
2019 in youth association football
August 2019 sports events in North America